General Nakhchivanski may refer to:

Huseyn Khan Nakhchivanski (1863–1919), Imperial Russian Army cavalry general 
Ismail Khan Nakhchivanski (1819–1909), Imperial Russian Army cavalry general
Jamshid Nakhchivanski (1895–1938), Soviet Army Combrig (equivalent to brigadier general)
Kelbali Khan Nakhchivanski (1824–1883), Imperial Russian Army cavalry general